The Picts and the Martyrs is the eleventh book in Arthur Ransome's Swallows and Amazons series of children's books. It was published in 1943. This is the last completed book set in the Lake District and features the Blackett sisters, the Amazons and the Callum siblings, Dick and Dorothea, known as the Ds. Ransome's most native character, the Great Aunt also features prominently as do many aspects of Lakeland life. The Dog's Home is based on a small stone hut built in the woods above Coniston Water close to Ransome's then residence.

Characters
 The D's - Dick and Dorothea Callum
 The Amazons - Peggy and Nancy Blackett
 The Great Aunt (Maria Turner)
 Jacky Warriner
 Sammy Lewthwaite the policeman
 Billy Lewthwaite the gardener (Sammy's brother) 
 Cook - cook in the Blackett household
 Timothy Stedding - known as "Squashy Hat" in Pigeon Post

Plot summary

The Ds have been invited to stay at Beckfoot at the start of the summer holidays while Mrs Blackett has gone with her brother, James Turner (whom they call Captain Flint), on a cruise for her health. However, when Great Aunt Maria finds out that the Blackett girls have been left at home, she decides to come and take care of them. She is unaware of the Ds' visit.

Nancy Blackett insists that the Ds' holiday will not be spoiled and that they will learn to sail the Scarab, a dinghy their father has bought for them. So they move out to the Dog's Home, a small hut in the woods, and become secretive Picts while the Blacketts are martyrs to the Great Aunt.  They are schooled in woodcraft by Jacky a local boy who brings them a rabbit to skin, gut and cook, and teaches them how to tickle trout.  In the woods, Dick's ornithology comes to the fore.  True to her character, Dorothea constantly romanticises their situation.

The Great Aunt attempts to civilize the Amazon pirates, for example by making them read aloud, recite poetry and perform their party-pieces on the piano. Despite these ordeals, they manage to accomplish a number of adventures.  They succeed in escaping for a day to accompany Captain Flint's partner Timothy to the copper-mine previously discovered in Pigeon Post.  The Ds succeed in burgling Captain Flint's study at Beckfoot to commandeer some chemical equipment that Timothy needs. They are also introduced to sailing the Scarab.  The Great Aunt in fact suspects that the Amazons are meeting the Swallows. Near the end of her visit, the Great Aunt goes missing and there is a hue and cry and search for her. She has gone to make her own enquiries after the suspected Swallows, but is forced to admit that she has been quite wrong.  The Ds find her on Captain Flint's houseboat where Timothy has been living in somewhat squalid circumstances.  Despite being the very people who must not meet her, they deliver her back to Beckfoot in their boat in time to catch her train, and manage to avoid revealing their identities. They slip away before they can be questioned, and Nancy manages to save the Great Aunt some embarrassment for which she gets praised in a letter to her mother.

The writing of The Picts and the Martyrs 
Ransome's wife Evgenia hated the book while it was being written, but his mother Edith persuaded him to publish it. Genia was often discouraging about his books while he was writing them.

References

External links
 

1943 British novels
1943 children's books
Novels set in the Lake District
Jonathan Cape books
Picts in fiction
Swallows and Amazons series